Welspun Group is an Indian multinational conglomerate, headquartered in Mumbai. It has diverse businesses in line pipes, textiles, Infrastructure, and steel. It does business with 50 countries and has a distribution network in 32 countries, including the US, Canada, the UK, and Australia. Welspun was founded in 1985 by Balkrishan Goenka and his cousin Rajesh R. Mandawewala.

Welspun Group has over 26,000 employees, and a revenue of US$2.3 billion, and is India's biggest exporter of home textile products.

History

1985- 1990 
Welspun India Limited was founded in 1985 as Welspun Winilon Silk Mills Pvt., a Private Limited Company in Mumbai. The Company's original objective was to produce polyester filament yarns and texturized yarns. Welspun was promoted by the G.R.G. group, led by G.R. Goenka.

In 1986/89, the Company established two yarn texturizing factories. One with a texturizing machine of 216 spindles at Palghar, District Thane, produced 797.5 MT of yarn per annum. The other had the same capacity and was set up at Silvassa. A modern polyester filament flat yarn manufacturing unit was established in Achhad, District Thane, in 1990 with a 605 MT per annum capacity.

1991-2000 
In October 1991, 17,10,000 shares were offered to the general public, which issued a total of 18,00,000 shares. This included a ₹5 per share premium, with 90,000 shares reserved and allocated to employees. As a result, from 2,200 MT to 3,500 MT, the Company's annual capacity increased.

In 1993, the Company committed to building up a 15,000-spindle cotton spinning project at Village Morai, near Vapi, Gujarat, to produce terry towels. In addition, Welspun proposed a POY project at Silvassa, Dadra, and Nagar Haveli with a 15,000 MTPA capacity. The Company issued equity shares priced at ₹10 with an ₹40 per share premium.

In 1994 and 1995, the Company raised its capacity to produce terry towels from 3100 MTPA to 5200 MTPA. Also, it began creating power plants that could generate 40 M.W. spinning machines for terry towels and cotton to use captive power sources. On October 12, the Company name was replaced with Welspun India Ltd. instead of Welspun Polyesters (India) Ltd. The Company obtained an advanced plant from Rieter automatic GMBH in Germany to launch its polyester filament yarn project.

In 1996, the Company leased its polyester yarn division at Silvassa to M/s. Welspun Syntex Ltd. At its 100% export-oriented unit Plant in Vapi, Gujarat, the Company formed a joint venture with Vincenzo Zucchi S.P.A., Italy, to manufacture Terry bathrobes and Terry made-ups.

In 2000, the Company acknowledged that an entirely subsidiary, Welspun U.S.A. Inc., had been established in the United States.

2001- 2010 
In 2001, the Company's spinning sector experienced a demerger forming Welspun Cotton Yarn Ltd. The Non-convertible debentures (N.C.D.s) of the Company were downgraded from a "B" rating to a "D" rating by Credit Rating and Information Services of India Ltd.

On August 25, 2008, Welspun India Ltd. appointed Mr. Ram Gopal Sharma as an additional director of the Company. In 2009 Welspun India Ltd appointed Mr. B K Goenka as the Chairman and Managing Director of the Company. Also, Mr. Shashikant Thorat was selected as 'Assistant Company Secretary and Compliance Officer of Welspun India Limited.

In 2006-08, Welspun India Ltd. appointed Ms. Revathy Ashok as the Additional Director of the Company. Ram Gopal Sharma was appointed to the board of directors of Welspun India Ltd. on August 25, 2008.

In 2009, Mr. B K Goenka was appointed Chairman and Managing Director of the Company by Welspun India Ltd. Also, Mr. Shashikant Thorat was chosen to serve as Welspun India Limited's assistant company secretary and compliance officer.

In 2010 Qualified Institutions Placement for Welspun India has effectively priced at ₹156.03 crores.

2011- 2021 
In 2011-12, B.K. Goenka and Rajesh R. Mandawewala were designated Executive Chairman and Managing Director of Welspun India Ltd. Mr. Arun Todarwal was elected to the Company's board of directors in 2012.

In 2013 Welspun Corp. Ltd. reported the sale of a USD 99 million stake in Leighton Welspun India. The Executive Director position was given to Mrs. Dipali Goenka on April 1.

In 2014, Welspun India Ltd distributed 23,500 equity shares to several company employees who had utilized their option rights under the Company's ESOP plan.

In 2015-16, the first package of the Delhi-Meerut Expressway Project was offered to Welspun Enterprises. The Company launched a 32 M.W. solar power plant. It also established its online retail portal. In 2016 Welspun India opened an INR 600 crore carpet plant. In Anjar, Gujarat, the Company built the infrastructure for the production of carpets, area rugs, and carpet tiles.

In 2018-20, Welspun India established a subsidiary company in Delaware, United States of America, and partially resumed operations at Gujarati manufacturing units.

Management 
Management of Welspun Group

Listed companies

Welspun India Ltd 
Welspun Winilon Silk Mills Pvt. Ltd began operating as a producer of synthetic yarn in 1985. First, the name was changed to Welspun Polyesters (India) Ltd.; then, in 1995, the company renamed itself Welspun India Limited.

The company manufactures various products, including towels in multiple sizes and qualities. They also introduced organic goods made of soy, seaweed, milk, and bamboo.

The largest manufacturer of Terry towels in Asia and one of the top 4 producers globally is Welspun India Ltd. Its operations are spread over several continents, and it has a distribution network in 32 countries, including the USA, UK, Canada, Australia, Italy, Sweden, and France.

Welspun Corp Ltd (Pipes & Steel) 
Welspun Corp Limited is a provider of welded line pipes to oil and gas companies. Some of the necessary pipelines for carrying out significant onshore and offshore projects are manufactured and distributed by its facilities in India, the Kingdom of Saudi Arabia, and the United States. The company can produce a variety of pipes, and it is one of the top three makers of welded line pipes globally.

In more than 50 nations, it has a diverse presence. The company was established on April 26, 1995, and its current activities include the production of high-grade submerged arc welded pipes and coating hot rolled steel plates and coils.

Welspun Corp declared that it would buy the division of the demerged firm Welspun Steel Limited at a meeting on June 28, 2021.

Welspun Steel Limited, a public company, was established on June 3, 2004. It operates in the production of basic iron and steel. I.S.I. Certified Ribbed Thermo Mechanically Treated (TMT) Rebars, an essential building material, are produced by the company at its Anjar factory. Balkrishan Gopiram Goenka, appointed on June 3, 2004, is currently the director with the longest tenure. Dilip Kumar Chokhra was selected to serve as the director on May 1, 2022.

Welspun Enterprises Ltd 
On November 5, 2012, Welspun Enterprises Limited was officially established under the Companies Act of 1956 as "Welspun Infra Enterprises Private Limited."

With effect from April 9, 2013, the Company became a public company, and its name was changed to "Welspun Infra Enterprises Limited."

After June 11, 2013, the Company's title was changed to "Welspun Enterprises Ltd."

A division of the Welspun Group, Welspun Enterprises is a firm that focuses on infrastructure development in road and water projects through large-value Engineering, Procurement, and Construction (E.P.C.) contracts. Six (Build-Operate-Transfer) B.O.T. (Toll) Road projects comprising more than 500 kilometers in length have been completed by the Company in the highway sector.

Welspun One Logistics Parks (WOLP) 
Welspun One Logistics Parks (WOLP) is a comprehensive investment and development management company that offers warehouse & industrial parks throughout India. As part of the Welspun Group, Welspun One has been delivering industrial projects on a large scale for over three decades, and has a revenue of $760M.

Employee Section 
The company has more than 26,000 employees, of which 25% are women. In addition, a total of 1,000 people from underprivileged regions are employed by Welspun every month. It is estimated that 50 to 60 percent of these workers are first-time employees.

References

External links
Leaders are born, not made by education – Hindustan Times
25 DEC 2010, 04.58AM IST,ET BUREAU Welspun Group to pay 470 cr for 35% in infrastructure firm

 
Manufacturing companies based in Mumbai
Indian companies established in 1985
1985 establishments in Maharashtra
Manufacturing companies established in 1985
Companies listed on the Bombay Stock Exchange